Nopparat Kiatkhamtorn (นพรัตน์ เกียรติกำธร) is a Thai retired Muay Thai fighter. He is a former two weight Lumpinee Stadium champion.

Biography and career

Nopparat started Muay Thai training at the age of 8 in his native Nakhon Si Thamnarat province. He trained at the Kiatbanchong and Petsiri gyms before joining Keatkhamtorn in Bangkok at the age of 18.

Titles and accomplishments
Lumpinee Stadium
 2004 Lumpinee Stadium 126 lbs Champion 
 2006 Lumpinee Stadium 130 lbs Champion (one defense)

Professional Boxing Association of Thailand (PAT) 
 2006 Thailand 130 lbs Champion

Isuzu Cup
 2011 Isuzu Cup Runner-up

Onesongchai
 2013 S-1 World -165 lbs Champion

Tournaments
 2003 Toyota D4D Marathon tournament (126 lbs) Runner-up
 2006 Gaiyanghadao 135 lbs Tournament Runner-up
 2009 La Grande Sfida Sui 4 Angoli 8-man Tournament Winner

World Kickboxing Network
 2009 W.K.N. World GP Big-8 Tournament Runner-up

World Muaythai Organization
 2016 WMO World -72kg Champion

Fight record

|-  style="background:#cfc;"
| 2017-02-18 || Win ||align=left| Martin Meoni || Ring War || Monza, Italy || Decision || 3 || 3:00

|-  style="background:#cfc;"
| 2016-02-06 || Win ||align=left| Luca Tagliarino || Ring War 3 || Assago, Italy || Decision || 5 || 3:00
|-
! style=background:white colspan=9 |

|-  style="background:#cfc;"
| 2014-01-25 || Win ||align=left| Luca Tagliarino || Ring War || Assago, Italy || Decision || 3 || 3:00

|-  style="background:#cfc;"
| 2013-12-05 || Win ||align=left| Geoffrey Riviere || King's Birthday || Bangkok, Thailand || TKO (Doctor stoppage) || 5 || 
|-
! style=background:white colspan=9 |

|-  style="background:#fbb;"
| 2013-11-02 || Loss ||align=left| Danchonlek, MP Niyom || Siam Omnoi Stadium || Samut Sakhon, Thailand || TKO (referee stoppage)|| 4 || 

|-  style="background:#;"
| 2013-01- ||  ||align=left| Vladimir Konsky || MTE 18 || Sassari, Italy || Decision || 5||3:00

|-  style="background:#cfc;"
| 2012-11-24 || Win ||align=left| Claudio Amoruso || Hearts on Fire Fight Night || Quartu Sant'Elena, Italy || KO || 4|| 

|-  style="background:#cfc;"
| 2011-08-20 || Win ||align=left| Moses Tor.Sangtiennoi || Siam Omnoi Stadium || Samut Sakhon, Thailand || Decision || 5 || 3:00

|-  bgcolor="#fbb"
| 2011-06-11 || Loss ||align=left| Kem Sitsongpeenong || Isuzu Tournament Final, Omnoi Stadium || Samut Sakhon, Thailand || KO (Doctor stopapge/Elbow) || 3 ||
|-
! style=background:white colspan=9 |

|-  style="background:#cfc;"
| 2011-03-05 || Win ||align=left| Antoine Pinto || Siam Omnoi Stadium - Isuzu Cup || Samut Sakhon, Thailand || Decision || 5 || 3:00

|-  style="background:#cfc;"
| 2011-01-29 || Win ||align=left| Kongjak Sor Tuantong || Siam Omnoi Stadium - Isuzu Cup || Samut Sakhon, Thailand || TKO (referee stopapge)|| 4 || 

|-  bgcolor="#fbb"
| 2010-12-25 || Loss ||align=left| Kem Sitsongpeenong || Siam Omnoi Stadium - Isuzu Cup || Samut Sakhon, Thailand || TKO (Ref. stop/right cross) || 3 || 0:39

|-  style="background:#cfc;"
| 2010-12-04 || Win ||align=left| Eric Renon || King's Birthday || Bangkok, Thailand || Decision || 5 || 3:00

|-  style="background:#cfc;"
| 2010-10-16 || Win ||align=left| Moses Tor.Sangtiennoi || Siam Omnoi Stadium || Samut Sakhon, Thailand || Decision || 5 || 3:00

|-  style="background:#cfc;"
| 2010-07-19 || Win ||align=left| Thepsutin Phumpanmuang || Kiatyongyut, Rajadamnern Stadium || Bangkok, Thailand || Decision || 5 || 3:00 

|-  style="background:#cfc;"
| 2010-01-16 || Win ||align=left| Antoine Pinto || Thailand vs Challenger Series || Bangkok, Thailand || Decision (Split) || 5 || 3:00

|-  style="background:#fbb;"
| 2009-09-12 || Loss  ||align=left| Andrei Kulebin || W.K.N. World GP Big-8 Tournament '09, Final || Minsk, Belarus || Decision (Unanimous) || 3 || 3:00  
|-
! style=background:white colspan=9 |

|-  style="background:#cfc;"
| 2009-09-12 || Win ||align=left|  || W.K.N. World GP Big-8 Tournament '09, Semi Finals || Minsk, Belarus || ||  ||  

|-  style="background:#cfc;"
| 2009-09-12 || Win ||align=left|  || W.K.N. World GP Big-8 Tournament '09, Quarter Finals || Minsk, Belarus ||  ||  ||  

|-  style="background:#fbb;"
| 2009-06-08 || Loss ||align=left| Bovy Sor Udomson || Suek Wansongchai, Rajadamnern Stadium || Bangkok, Thailand || Decision || 5 || 3:00

|-  style="background:#cfc;"
| 2009-05-02 || Win||align=left| Sak Kaoponlek || La Grande Sfida Sui 4 Angoli, Final || Rimini, Italy || TKO (Exhaustion)|| 2 ||
|-
! style=background:white colspan=9 |

|-  style="background:#cfc;"
| 2009-05-02 || Win ||align=left| Elia Filipini || La Grande Sfida Sui 4 Angoli, Semi Final || Rimini, Italy || Decision || 3 ||3:00

|-  style="background:#cfc;"
| 2009-05-02 || Win ||align=left| Cédric Muller  || La Grande Sfida Sui 4 Angoli, Quarter Final || Rimini, Italy || Ext.R Decision || 4 ||3:00

|-  bgcolor="#fbb"
| 2008-12-05 || Loss ||align=left| Egon Racz || King's Birthday - S1 World Championship Semi Final || Bangkok, Thailand || KO (Right cross)||  || 

|-  bgcolor="#cfc"
| 2008-12-05 || Win ||align=left| Christophe Mertens || King's Birthday - S1 World Championship Quarter Final || Bangkok, Thailand || Decision || 3 || 3:00

|-  bgcolor="#cfc"
| 2008-07-21 || Win ||align=left| Phetsanguan Sitniwat || Phettongkam, Rajadamnern Stadium || Bangkok, Thailand || Decision || 5 || 3:00

|-  bgcolor="#fbb"
| 2008-06-12 || Loss ||align=left| Kem Sitsongpeenong || Onesongchai, Rajaphat Institute || Nakhon Pathom, Thailand || Decision (Unanimous) || 5 || 3:00

|-  bgcolor="#fbb"
| 2008-05-05 || Loss ||align=left| Kem Sitsongpeenong ||  || Bangkok, Thailand || KO || 2 ||

|-  bgcolor="#cfc"
| 2008-02-07 || Win ||align=left| Kem Sitsongpeenong || Wanthongchai, Rajadamnern Stadium || Bangkok, Thailand || Decision (Unanimous) || 5 || 3:00

|-  style="background:#fbb;"
| 2007-11-24 || Loss ||align=left| Bovy Sor Udomson || Onesongchai Loi Krathong Superfights || Nonthaburi, Thailand || KO (Body punches)|| 3 || 

|-  style="background:#cfc;"
| 2007-08-30 || Win ||align=left| Saenchainoi Wor Petchpun || Rajadamnern Stadium || Bangkok, Thailand || Decision || 5 || 3:00

|-  style="background:#cfc;"
| 2007-07-03 || Win ||align=left| Singdam Kiatmuu9 || Petchpiya, Lumpinee Stadium || Bangkok, Thailand || Decision || 5 || 3:00

|-  bgcolor="#cfc"
| 2007-05-23 || Win ||align=left| Kem Sitsongpeenong || Sor.Sommai, Rajadamnern Stadium || Bangkok, Thailand || Decision || 5 || 3:00

|-  style="background:#fbb;"
| 2006-11-17 || Loss ||align=left| Kongpipop Petchyindee || Gaiyanghadao Tournament, Final || Nakhon Ratchasima, Thailand || KO (Knees)|| 2 || 
|-
! style=background:white colspan=9 |

|-  style="background:#cfc;"
| 2006-11-17 || Win ||align=left| Orono Wor Petchpun || Gaiyanghadao Tournament, Semi Final || Nakhon Ratchasima, Thailand || Decision || 3 || 3:00

|-  style="background:#cfc;"
| 2006-11-17 || Win ||align=left| Saenchai Sor.Khamsing || Gaiyanghadao Tournament, Quarter Final || Nakhon Ratchasima, Thailand || Decision || 3 || 3:00

|- bgcolor="#fbb"
| 2006-10-17|| Loss ||align=left| Attachai Fairtex || Petchpiya, Lumpinee Stadium|| Bangkok, Thailand || KO || 4 || 0:48

|-  style="background:#fbb;"
| 2006-08-11 || Loss||align=left|  Duangsompong Kor Sapaotong || Punpanmuang, Lumpinee Stadium || Bangkok, Thailand || Decision || 5 || 3:00

|-  style="background:#cfc;"
| 2006-07-14 || Win ||align=left| Singdam Kiatmuu9 || Jo Por Lor 7 + Petchpiya, Lumpinee Stadium || Bangkok, Thailand || Decision || 5 || 3:00
|-
! style=background:white colspan=9 |

|- style="background:#cfc;"
| 2006-06-02 || Win||align=left| Saenchai Sor.Khamsing|| Lumpinee Champion Krirkkrai, Lumpinee Stadium || Bangkok, Thailand || Decision || 5 || 3:00
|-
! style=background:white colspan=9 |

|- style="background:#c5d2ea;"
| 2006-04-25 || Draw ||align=left| Saenchai Sor.Khamsing|| Petchpiya, Lumpinee Stadium || Bangkok, Thailand || Decision || 5 || 3:00
|-

|- style="background:#cfc;"
| 2006-02-22 || Win ||align=left| Saenchai Sor.Khamsing|| Meenayothin, Rajadamnern Stadium || Bangkok, Thailand || Decision || 5 || 3:00

|- style="background:#c5d2ea;"
| 2006-01-17 || Draw ||align=left| Saenchai Sor.Khamsing|| Petchyindee, Lumpinee Stadium || Bangkok, Thailand || Decision || 5 || 3:00
|-
! style=background:white colspan=9 |

|-  bgcolor="#cfc"
| 2005-12-20 || Win ||align=left| Attachai Fairtex || Wanboonya, Lumpinee Stadium || Bangkok, Thailand || Decision|| 5 || 3:00

|-  style="background:#fbb;"
| 2005-10-21 || Loss||align=left| Singdam Kiatmuu9 || Lumpinee Champion Krikkrai, Lumpinee Stadium || Bangkok, Thailand || Decision || 5 || 3:00

|- style="background:#cfc;"
| 2005-09-27 || Win ||align=left| Saenchai Sor.Khamsing|| Wanboonya, Lumpinee Stadium || Bangkok, Thailand || Decision || 5 || 3:00

|-  style="background:#cfc;"
| 2005-08-31 || Win ||align=left| Singdam Kiatmuu9 || Palangnoom, Rajadamnern Stadium || Bangkok, Thailand || Decision || 5 || 3:00

|-  bgcolor="#cfc"
| 2005-07-29 || Win ||align=left| Sakulphet Sor.Sakulpan || Petchpiya, Lumpinee Stadium || Bangkok, Thailand || Disqualification || 5 || 3:00

|-  bgcolor="#fbb"
| 2005-06-17 || Loss ||align=left| Kongpipop Petchyindee|| Wanboonya, Lumpinee Stadium || Bangkok, Thailand || KO || 2 ||

|-  bgcolor="#fbb"
| 2005-05-06 || Loss ||align=left| Anuwat Kaewsamrit || Petchyindee + Kor.Sapaotong, Lumpinee Stadium || Bangkok, Thailand || TKO || 1 || 
|-
! style=background:white colspan=9 |

|-  bgcolor="#cfc"
| 2005-03-18 || Win ||align=left| Orono Wor Petchpun || Petchyindee + Sapaotong, Lumpinee Stadium || Bangkok, Thailand || Decision || 5 || 3:00

|-  style="background:#fbb;"
| 2005-01-04 || Loss ||align=left| Singdam Kiatmuu9 || Petchyindee, Lumpinee Stadium || Bangkok, Thailand || Decision || 5 || 3:00

|-  style="background:#cfc;"
| 2004-12-07 || Win ||align=left| Kongpipop Petchyindee || Lumpinee Stadium Birthday Show || Bangkok, Thailand || Decision || 5 || 3:00
|-
! style=background:white colspan=9 |

|-  style="background:#cfc;"
| 2004-11-04 || Win ||align=left| Lerdsila Chumpairtour || Daorungchujarean, Rajadamnern Stadium || Bangkok, Thailand || Decision || 5 || 3:00

|-  style="background:#fbb;"
| 2004-09-28 || Loss ||align=left| Sibmuen Laemthongphaet || Petchyindee + Weerapol, Lumpinee Stadium || Bangkok, Thailand || Decision || 5 || 3:00

|-  style="background:#cfc;"
| 2004-08-10 || Win ||align=left| Yodteera Sityodthong || Petchyindee, Lumpinee Stadium || Bangkok, Thailand || Decision || 5 || 3:00

|-  style="background:#cfc;"
| 2004-07-20 || Win ||align=left| Sailom Rachanon || Petchyindee, Lumpinee Stadium || Bangkok, Thailand || Decision || 5 || 3:00

|-  style="background:#cfc;"
| 2004-05-28 || Win ||align=left| Saengarthit Sasiprapagym || Petchyindee, Lumpinee Stadium || Bangkok, Thailand || Decision || 5 || 3:00

|-  style="background:#fbb;"
| 2003-11-15 || Loss ||align=left| Yodsanklai Fairtex || Lumpinee Krikkai, Lumpinee Stadium || Bangkok, Thailand || Decision || 5 || 3:00

|-  style="background:#cfc;"
| 2003- || Win ||align=left| Wanmeechai Meenayothin || Lumpinee Stadium || Bangkok, Thailand || Decision || 5 || 3:00

|-  bgcolor="#fbb"
| 2003-07-29 || Loss ||align=left| Anuwat Kaewsamrit || DFD CommonReal3000 + Petchyindee, Lumpinee Stadium || Bangkok, Thailand || TKO || 1 ||

|-  style="background:#fbb;"
| 2003-03-28 || Loss ||align=left| Yodsanklai Fairtex || Lumpinee Stadium - Toyota Marathon, Final || Bangkok, Thailand || KO (Uppercut) || 3 || 
|-
! style=background:white colspan=9 |

|-  bgcolor="#cfc"
| 2003-01-07 || Win ||align=left| Kaew Fairtex ||  Lumpinee Stadium || Bangkok, Thailand || Decision  || 5 || 3:00

|-  bgcolor="#cfc"
| 2002-12-03 || Win ||align=left| Sitthichai Kiyarat ||  Lumpinee Stadium || Bangkok, Thailand || Decision  || 5 || 3:00

|-  bgcolor="#cfc"
| 2002-05-03 || Win ||align=left| Chaowalit Sit-O ||  Lumpinee Stadium || Bangkok, Thailand || Decision  || 5 || 3:00

|-  bgcolor="#cfc"
| 2002- || Win ||align=left| Rungrawee Kor.Sakphadungkit ||  Lumpinee Stadium || Bangkok, Thailand || Decision  || 5 || 3:00

|-  bgcolor="#fbb"
| 2002- || Loss ||align=left| Chaowalit Sit-O ||  Lumpinee Stadium || Bangkok, Thailand || Decision  || 5 || 3:00

|-  bgcolor="#cfc"
| 2002- || Win ||align=left| Worawut Fairtex ||  Lumpinee Stadium || Bangkok, Thailand || Decision  || 5 || 3:00

|-  bgcolor="#cfc"
| 2002- || Win ||align=left| Hongthongnoi Kor.Kalpitan ||  Lumpinee Stadium || Bangkok, Thailand || Decision  || 5 || 3:00
|-
| colspan=9 | Legend:

References

1983 births
Living people
Nopparat Keatkhamtorn
Nopparat Keatkhamtorn